Laazar is a surname. Notable people with the surname include:

List of people with the surname 

 Achraf Lazaar (born 1992), Moroccan footballer
 Fiona Lazaar (born 1983), French politician
 Kamel Lazaar (born 1952),Tunisian-Swiss financier
 Lina Lazaar (born 1983), Tunisian art critic
 Mehdi Lazaar (born 1993), Belgian footballer
 Moncef Lazaâr (1942–2018), Tunisian actor and screenwriter

Arabic-language surnames
Surnames of Arabic origin
Surnames of Algerian origin
Surnames of Moroccan origin
Surnames of Tunisian origin